Charanjeet Kaushal (born 3 August 1974 at Dehradun) is an Uttarakhand politician belongs to Indian National Congress. He served as the Councillor from Govindgarh ward of Dehradun Municipal Corporation (2013–18). He is continuously serving as the General Secretary of Dehradun Congress since 2010. In 2013 Dehradun Municipal Corporation election, he defeated veteran BJP leader Surendra Singh Kukreja with a margin of 262 votes.

Election Result

See also
 Komal Vohra

References

1974 births
Living people
20th-century Indian politicians
Indian National Congress politicians from Uttarakhand